Q-Tex were a Scottish techno music group active in the 1990s. Their line up consisted of Gillian Tennant (vocals), Scott Brown (keyboards), Gordon Anderson (keyboards) and Alan Todd (keyboards), and first played at The Metro, Saltcoats, Ayrshire, Scotland in 1991.

The group had several major hits on the Scottish Singles Chart and UK Singles Chart, their breakthrough and most well-known being "The Power of Love" which charted twice, first in 1994 (#13 Scotland, #65 UK) and again as a remix in 1997 (#10 Scotland, #49 UK). "Believe" is their highest Scottish charting single, peaking at #2, and "Let the Love" is their highest UK charting single, peaking at #30.

Their album Into the Light charted at #89 in the UK in July 1997.

Singles

References

External links
 Fantazia.org.uk - Profile and 1994 interview

Scottish electronic music groups
British dance music groups
British techno music groups
Hardcore techno music groups